The 1964 Lowood 4 Hour was a motor race for production touring cars staged at the Lowood circuit in Queensland, Australia on 12 April 1964. The race, which was promoted by the Queensland Racing Drivers' Club Ltd., was the first of three Lowood 4 Hour races to be held at the circuit.

Whilst the emphasis was on class results, the Ford Cortina GT driven by Harry Firth and John Raeburn had completed the greatest number of laps at the end of the four hours. This same car, driven by Harry Firth and Bob Jane, had won the 1963 Armstrong 500 endurance race at Bathurst six months before and was using the same set of tyres that had been on the car during its earlier victory.

Classes 
Cars competed in four classes grouped according to the retail selling price of each car.
 Class A : Up to £900
 Class B : £901 to £1,000
 Class C : £1,001 to £1,200
 Class D : £1,201 to £2,000

Results

Notes
 Of the 20 cars which started the race, 17 finished and three retired.
 The Butler Car Electrics Trophy for the first Queensland entrant was awarded to the Downshift Racing Team (Morris Cooper).

References

Lowood 4 Hour
Lowood 4 Hour